Mark Allan Nordquist (born November 3, 1945 in Long Beach, California) is a former professional American football offensive lineman who played a total of nine seasons in the National Football League for the Philadelphia Eagles and the Chicago Bears.

1945 births
Living people
Pacific Tigers football players
Philadelphia Eagles players
Chicago Bears players
Players of American football from Long Beach, California
American football offensive guards